Albert James Powell (8 December 1893—15 February 1979) was an English cricketer, who played a single first-class match, for Worcestershire against Lancashire at Worcester in August 1921. In an innings defeat for his county, Powell playing as a bowler scored 9 and 1, also bowling three wicketless overs.

Notes

References
Albert Powell from CricketArchive
Lists of matches and detailed statistics from CricketArchive

English cricketers
Worcestershire cricketers
1893 births
1979 deaths